Alina Cho is an American journalist who was a television correspondent and former host of CNN's "Fashion: Backstage Pass", and is an Editor at Large at Ballantine Bantam Dell, a division of Penguin Random House. Cho is responsible for developing and co-editing books in the lifestyle and fashion genre.
Cho is also the host of a lecture series at The Metropolitan Museum of Art called "The Atelier with Alina Cho".

Cho held various posts at ABC and CNBC.  She earned an M.S. from Northwestern University's Medill School of Journalism and a B.A. from Boston College. She lives in Manhattan and Southampton, New York.

References

External links
 
 

1971 births
Living people
Boston College alumni
American television news anchors
Medill School of Journalism alumni
People from Vancouver, Washington
American women television journalists
CNN people
CNBC people
American writers of Korean descent
21st-century American women